Jau is a town in Ruweng Administrative Area. Whether it belongs to the territory of Sudan or South Sudan is controversial.

References

Ruweng Administrative Area
Territorial disputes of South Sudan
Territorial disputes of Sudan